This is a list of museums in Mauritius.

List 
 Blue Penny Museum
 Folk Museum of Indian Immigration
 Frederik Hendrik Museum
 Musée de la Photographie
 National History Museum, Mahebourg
 Natural History Museum, Port Louis
 Robert Edward Hart Memorial Museum
 Sookdeo Bissoondoyal Memorial Museum
 Sir Seewoosagur Ramgoolam Memorial Centre for Culture
 Peopling of Mauritius Museum
 Mauritius Postal Museum
 Château de Labourdonnais
 Eureka House

See also 

 Mahatma Gandhi Institute
 Mauritius Museums Council
 List of museums

External links 
 Museums in Mauritius

 
Mauritius
Museums
Museums
Mauritius
Museums